Mohammed Al-Nabhani (born 1 September 1985) is an Omani former professional tennis player.

Biography
Al-Nabhani was born in 1985 to an Omani father and Egyptian mother. His two siblings, Fatma and Khalid, are also tennis players. He has formed doubles partnerships with both in international competition, including at the Asian Games, where he competed with sister Fatma in mixed doubles in 2010 and 2018.

Since 2000 he has represented Oman in the Davis Cup and as of 2019 holds the team records for most ties played (71), most singles wins (40) and most doubles wins (37). His Davis Cup doubles partnership with brother Khalid has amassed 26 wins, which puts them among the top-5 in competition history.

Al-Nabhani had a stint early in his career playing collegiate tennis for the University of Toledo.

On the ATP Tour, Al-Nabhani made a main draw appearance 2011 at the Dubai Tennis Championships, where he and partner Omar Alawadhi lost their first round match to Marcel Granollers and Dick Norman in a match tiebreak.

References

External links
 
 
 

1985 births
Living people
Omani tennis players
Male tennis players
Toledo Rockets athletes
College men's tennis players in the United States
Sportspeople from Cairo
Asian Games competitors for Oman
Tennis players at the 2010 Asian Games
Tennis players at the 2018 Asian Games
Omani sportsmen